True Love Cast Out All Evil is a 2010 album by Roky Erickson, his first album of new material in 14 years. Produced by Okkervil River's Will Sheff, the album also features the members of Okkervil River on most songs as Erickson's backing band. The album also includes field recordings of songs from Erickson's time in a Texas insane asylum. It was released by ANTI- in America and by Chemikal Underground in Europe.

Critical reception
The album was well received by critics: according to Metacritic, the album has received an average review score of 82/100, based on 26 reviews, indicating "universal acclaim."  PopMatters called the album "a staggeringly life-affirming work that sticks to your soul long after the final notes ring out." A.V. Club reviewer Christopher Bahn, noting that Erickson's difficult personal life had made new recordings from him seem unlikely, said that "it’s a triumph merely that this album exists, but True Love’s musical richness goes beyond what could reasonably have been expected from even a resurgent Roky."

Track listing
All tracks composed by Roky Erickson
"Devotional Number One" – 2:17
"Ain't Blues Too Sad" – 1:24
"Goodbye Sweet Dreams" – 4:26
"Be and Bring Me Home" – 5:36
"Bring Back the Past" – 2:02
"Please, Judge" – 4:26
"John Lawman" – 3:57
"True Love Cast Out All Evil" – 4:30
"Forever" – 3:58
"Think of As One" – 5:21
"Birds'd Crash" – 3:59
"God Is Everywhere" – 2:41

Musicians

Roky Erickson & Okkervil River

 Roky Erickson – vocals, acoustic guitar (1, 7, 12), electric guitar (6)
 Scott Brackett – Hammond organ, trumpet, percussion
 Brian Cassidy – electric guitar (3, 5), piano (7), pedal steel (8), string quartet arrangements
 Lauren Gurgiolo – electric guitar
 Jonathan Meiburg – piano (3), electric guitar (7)
 Will Sheff – vocals, acoustic guitar, mellotron, piano (1, 4, 5, 6, 8), electric guitar (1, 3, 9), Hammond organ (1, 2, 8), drums (10), jug
 Justin Sherburn – piano, pump organ, Wurlitzer, Rhodes, horn arrangements
 Travis Nelsen – drums and percussion
 Patrick Pestorius – bass

Guests

 Caitlin Bailey – cello
 Gilbert Elorreaga – trumpet (4, 7, 10)
 José Galeano – congas, guira
 Mark Gonzalez – trombone
 Josh Levy – baritone saxophone
 Annalise Ohse – violin
 Sarah Pizzichemi – violin
 Stuart Sullivan – chair
 Tara Szczygielski – electric and acoustic violins (1, 3, 6, 8)
 Will Thothong – viola
 Beth Wawerna – vocals (8, 9)
 Unknown Inmate – additional acoustic guitar (1, 10)

References

Roky Erickson albums
2010 albums
Anti- (record label) albums